Saint Catherine North West is a parliamentary constituency represented in the House of Representatives of the Jamaican Parliament. It elects one Member of Parliament MP by the first past the post system of election.

Members 

 Robert Pickersgill (PNP) (1989 to 2020)
 Hugh Graham (since 2020)

Boundaries 

Constituency covers Lludias Vale and Ewarton.

References

Parliamentary constituencies of Jamaica